Nabokov Studies is an annual peer-reviewed academic journal published by Davidson College and the International Vladimir Nabokov Society. The journal covers research on the Russian-American writer Vladimir Nabokov. The journal was established by D. Barton Johnson in 1994 and the editor-in-chief is Zoran Kuzmanovich. The journal covers critical and theoretical studies about the work by Vladimir Nabokov.

References

External links

Vladimir Nabokov
1994 establishments in the United States
Academic journals published by university presses of the United States
Annual journals
Davidson College
Literary magazines published in the United States
Magazines published in North Carolina
Publications established in 1994
Periodicals about writers